The Ukrainian Communist Party (Ukrayins’ka Komunistychna Partiya) was an oppositional political party in Soviet Ukraine, from 1920 until 1925. Its followers were known as Ukapists (укапісти, ukapisty), from the initials UKP.

USDLP independents
The UKP was an offshoot party of the Ukrainian Social Democratic Labour Party (SD's) created in January 1920 by former members of the Social-Democrats who prior to that were organized as the group of the independent Social-Democrats, USDLP independents.  It opposed Russian domination within the future envisaged Socialist order as well as Russian domination of Republics formed within the territory of the former Russian empire. It condemned the Communist Party (Bolsheviks) of Ukraine (CP(b)U), criticizing it in its newspaper, Chervonyy Prapor for being subject to the Russian Bolshevik party in Moscow.

Communists
The initial membership of several hundred was made up of Ukrainian Social-Democrat Sovereigntists, former left-Ukrainian SRs Borotbists, and "federalists" from the CP(b)U, like Yuriy Lapchynsky. The Ukapists stood for a Soviet Ukraine with its own communist party separate from the Bolsheviks (renamed in March 1918 Russian Communist Party). In 1923 a faction within the UKP sponsored by the secret police (CHEKA) requested unification with the CPU. On August 27, 1920, then again in 1924, the UKP sent the Comintern a letter requesting  recognition of the independence of the Ukrainian SSR and the right of Ukrainians to have their own party in the Comintern. The Comintern, de facto run by the Russian Bolsheviks, answered that the Ukrainian republic as a sovereign state within the USSR was already represented and that therefore UKP should dissolve and unite with CP(b)U. Recent research has shown that on the eve of their dissolution their influence was rising in Kyiv and Katerynoslav provinces.

At its IV  congress the UKP formally abolished itself. Some members joined the Bolshevik CP(b)U, including its leader Andryi Richytsky  in order to have  some influence on Ukrainian politics.  Former Ukapists were purged in 1931–34, and then executed or exiled to Siberia.

See also
 Communist Party of Ukraine, the reanimated Communist Party (Bolsheviks) of Ukraine that was recreated in 1993 after the ban on Communists parties was lifted.
 Communist Party (Bolsheviks) of Ukraine, formally constituted in Moscow March 1918 as a sub-unit of the Russian Communist Party. It was banned in 1992 and later re-established.

Further reading
 Ford, C. "Outline History of the Ukrainian Communist Party (Independentists): An Emancipatory Communism 1918-1925."  Debatte: Journal of Contemporary Central and Eastern Europe, Volume 17, Issue 2 August 2009, pages 193 - 246
 Magocsi, Paul Robert (1996). A History of Ukraine, pp 532, 565–66. Toronto: University of Toronto Press. .
 Subtelny, Orest (1988). Ukraine: A History, 1st edition, pp 383–4. Toronto: University of Toronto Press. .   
 Velychenko S.,"Ukrainian Marxists and Russian Imperialism 1918-1923: Prelude to the Present in Eastern Europe’s Ireland," - See more at: http://www.irishleftreview.org/2014/05/23/ukrainian-marxists-russian-imperialism-19181923-prelude-present-eastern-europes-ireland/#sthash.GRKSRQo8.dpuf
 idem, Painting Imperialism and Nationalism Red. The Ukrainian Marxist Critique of Russian Communist Rule in Ukraine (1918-1925) (Toronto, 2015) https://web.archive.org/web/20150511060637/http://www.utppublishing.com/Painting-Imperialism-and-Nationalism-Red-The-Ukrainian-Marxist-Critique-of-Russian-Communist-Rule-in-Ukraine-1918-1925.html

References

Defunct communist parties in Ukraine
Political parties of the Russian Revolution
Communist parties in the Soviet Union
Ukrainian Soviet Socialist Republic
Ukrainian Communist Party politicians
1920 establishments in Ukraine
1925 disestablishments in Ukraine
Political parties established in 1920
Political parties disestablished in 1925